Nannodiella oxia, common name the glassy dwarf turrid, is a species of sea snail, a marine gastropod mollusk in the family Clathurellidae.

Description
The shell grows to a length of 5 mm.

Distribution
This species occurs in the Gulf of Mexico and the Caribbean Sea; in the Atlantic Ocean along North Carolina.

References

 G., F. Moretzsohn, and E. F. García. 2009. Gastropoda (Mollusca) of the Gulf of Mexico, pp. 579–699 in Felder, D.L. and D.K. Camp (eds.), Gulf of Mexico–Origins, Waters, and Biota. Biodiversity. Texas A&M Press, College Station, Texas

External links
 

oxia
Gastropods described in 1885